Li Rongfa (1845–1891) was a military rebel leader of the Taiping Rebellion. He was the second son of Li Xiucheng.

Name 
He was also known during his military tenure as Zhong Erwang or King Zhong II (忠二王).

History
The Qing dynasty dispatched the Jiangnan Daying to quell the Taiping Rebellion in Nanjing. In March 1858, they deployed 200,000 soldiers, and by May 1860 had occupied all of Jiangsu province except for Shanghai. This would eventually lead to the Battle of Shanghai.

Li Rongfa was just 14 years old at the time, and followed orders from his father, Li Xiucheng who was also involved in this battle.

See also
 Boxer Rebellion
 List of revolutions and rebellions
 List of wars and anthropogenic disasters by death toll
 Miao Rebellion (1854–1873)
 Nian Rebellion

Sources

 Tiān Guó Zwi (天國志)

References

1845 births
1891 deaths
Hakka generals
Military leaders of the Taiping Rebellion
People from Wuzhou
Generals from Guangxi